Athanassios Spyridon Fokas (born June 30, 1952) is a Greek mathematician, with degrees in Aeronautical Engineering and Medicine.  Since 2002, he is Professor of Nonlinear Mathematical Science  in the
Department of Applied Mathematics and Theoretical Physics (DAMTP) at the University of Cambridge.

Education
Fokas earned a BS in Aeronautics from Imperial College in 1975 and a PhD in Applied mathematics from Caltech in 1979. His dissertation, Invariants, Lie-Backlund Operators and Backlund Transformations, was written under the direction of Paco Axel Lagerstrom. He subsequently attended the Leonard M. Miller School of Medicine at the University of Miami, earning his medical degree in 1986.

Career
After medical school, Fokas was appointed Professor and Chair of the Department of Mathematics and Computer Science at Clarkson University in 1986. From there, he moved to Imperial College in 1996 to a Chair of Applied Mathematics. Since 2002, he holds the Professorship of Nonlinear Mathematical Science (2000) in the Department of Applied Mathematics and Theoretical Physics at the University of Cambridge, a professorship established in the year 2000 for a single tenure. He was elected a Member of the Academy of Athens in 2004 and a professorial fellow of Clare Hall, Cambridge in 2005.

Research contributions
Fokas has written about symmetries, integrable nonlinear PDEs, Painleve equations and random matrices, models for leukemia and protein folding, electro-magneto-enchephalography, nuclear imaging, and relativistic gravity. Also, he has introduced a new method for solving boundary value problems known as the Fokas method.

I. M. Gelfand, a mathematician, who has also written about biology, in the citation for the Aristeion prize, wrote ''Fokas is now a very rare example of a scientist in the style of the Renaissance".

Awards
Fokas received the Naylor Prize from the London Mathematical Society in 2000.  He was awarded a Guggenheim Fellowship (2009).

Personal
Fokas is married to Regina Karousou-Fokas with whom he has two children, Anastasia and Ioanna. He also has a son, Alexander, from his first marriage to Allison Pearce.

Books
 M J Ablowitz and A S Fokas, Complex Variables: Introduction and Applications, Cambridge University Press, second edition (2003)
 A S Fokas, A R Its, A A Kapaev and V Yu Novokshenov, Painlevé Transcendents: A Riemann-Hilbert Approach, AMS (2006)
 A S Fokas,  A Unified Approach to Boundary Value Problems , CBMS-SIAM (2008)
 A S Fokas and B. Pelloni, eds, Unified Transform for Boundary Value Problems: Applications and advances, SIAM (2015).

See also
Calogero–Degasperis–Fokas equation
Fokas method

References

External links
 Home Page at Cambridge University
 
 ISI Highly Cited Researchers - AS Fokas

1952 births
Living people
Academics of Imperial College London
20th-century British mathematicians
21st-century British mathematicians
Greek mathematicians
Alumni of Imperial College London
California Institute of Technology alumni
Leonard M. Miller School of Medicine alumni
Clarkson University faculty
Academics of the University of Cambridge
Fellows of Clare Hall, Cambridge
Commanders of the Order of the Phoenix (Greece)
People from Argostoli